Canto y Guitarra, Volumen No. 4 is an album by Argentine singer and guitarist Atahualpa Yupanqui. It was released in 1957 on the Odeon label.

Track listing
Side A
 "Chacarera del pantano" (Atahualpa Yupanqui, Pablo del Cerro)
 "El paisano errant"e (Atahualpa Yupanqui)
 "El coyita (Pablo del Cerro)
 "Burruyacu (Atahualpa Yupanqui, Pablo del Cerro) 

Side B
 "El llanto" (Andrés Chazarreta)
 "Le tengo rabia al silencio" (Atahualpa Yupanqui)
 "Vidala" (traditional) 
 "Campo abierto" (Atahualpa Yupanqui)

References

1957 albums
Atahualpa Yupanqui albums